Neill Rea (born 1971) is a New Zealand actor, best known for playing the lead role of DI Mike Shepherd in television police procedural The Brokenwood Mysteries.

Rea was born in 1971, and is a graduate of Toi Whakaari drama school. Early roles included small parts in Hercules: The Legendary Journeys and Duggan, before he landed a larger part as Scotty, one of the flatmates in 1999 comedy-drama film Scarfies. Other noted roles include a semi-regular guest appearance in comedy-drama Go Girls in 2011 and 2012, and a role in 2010 film The Warrior's Way.

Apart from acting, Rea also works as a casting director, and is the owner of Auckland-based casting agency Fly Casting.

References

External links

1971 births
New Zealand actors
Living people